Jesús is a district in the Itapúa Department of Paraguay.  It is well known for its Jesuit Mission, the Ruins of Jesús de Tavarangue. In 1993, the mission was declared a UNESCO World Heritage Site, and is open to visitation by tourists.

Location
Jesús is located 10 km from Ruta 6, 40 km north of the department’s capital, Encarnación, and is surrounded by the following districts:

Hohenau to the east and north-east.
La Paz to the west and north-west.
Capitán Miranda to the west.
Trinidad to the south.

Population
According to the projection made by the Dirección General de Estadísticas, Encuestas y Censos, as of 2017 the district will have a total of 6,363 inhabitants.

References

Districts of Itapúa Department